Water skiing event was held at the 26th Southeast Asian Games.

Participating nations

Medal summary

Men

Women

References

2011 Southeast Asian Games events
2011
South